Nos Lendemains is francophone Canadian pop singer Isabelle Boulay's sixth studio album, released in March, 2008. A first single, "Ton Histoire", was available one month later and currently charted. The album hit the top ten in Belgium (Wallonia) and France.

There were three formats for this album : CD, CD collector edition and digital download.

Track listing

 "Dieu des amours" — 2:54
 "Nos Lendemains" — 3:11
 "Ton Histoire" — 3:31
 "Où est ma vie?" — 3:21
 "Ne me dis pas qu'il faut sourire" — 3:20
 "Coucouroucoucou Paloma" — 3:50
 "L'amour d'un homme" — 3:13
 "Juste une étoile" — 3:00
 "N'aimer que t'aimer" — 3:59
 "Reviens, reviens, reviens" — 3:01
 "L'appuntamento" — 3:57
 "Je ne t'en veux pas" — 3:41
 "Vouloir t'aimer" — 3:58

Charts

Certifications

References

2008 albums
Isabelle Boulay albums
V2 Records albums